The Grand Rapids Art Museum (GRAM) is an art museum located in Grand Rapids, Michigan, United States, with collections ranging from Renaissance to Modern Art and special collections on 19th and 20th-century European and American art.  Its holdings include notable modern art works such as Richard Diebenkorn’s 1963 Ingleside.  The museum has in its collection 5,000 works of art, including over 3,500 prints, drawings and photographs.

History

The museum was founded in 1910 under the name Grand Rapids Art Gallery, which was soon altered to its present name. Initially based in a former residence at 230 Fulton Street, it moved to the historic Federal Building on Pearl Street in 1981.

In 2004, construction began on a new green museum building, which was to be LEED certified. The  building, which features  of gallery and exhibition space, has been certified LEED Gold. London-based Munkenbeck+Marshall Architects was appointed architect for the new building in 2002 and developed the design from initial concept to construction document phase. In summer 2004, the museum board terminated Munkenbeck+Marshall's involvement and hired architect Kulapat Yantrasast of wHY Architecture to complete the project.

Artists

Several artists have displayed their work in the museum, such as Samuel Yellin, Frederick Carl Frieseke, Harriet Whitney Frishmuth, Doug Argue and Ryan Spencer Reed, among others.

References

External links
 

Museums in Grand Rapids, Michigan
Art museums and galleries in Michigan
Art museums established in 1910
1910 establishments in Michigan
LEED certified buildings